Lodwar is the largest town in north-western Kenya, located west of Lake Turkana on the A1 road.  Its main industries are basket weaving and tourism.  The Loima Hills lie to its west. Lodwar is the capital of Turkana County. The town has a population of 82,970 in 2019.

History
According to the Insider’s guide to Kenya Lodwar's history began around 1933 when a trader named Shah Mohamed arrived on the banks of the Turkwell River. The roads were inaccessible, so he brought donkeys. He eventually built a permanent trading centre in Lodwar, including a gas station. The district commissioner's office was built, followed by a small medical clinic and a government prison. Police headquarters were built in Lokitaung, as tribal disputes were common in the area. During the 1960s, missionaries built schools in and around the town. Shah Mohamed opened several stores in the remote towns of this Turkana county because he was the only contractor and supplier to government departments, carried mail to the area, and supplied and transported goods for the Norwegian and Italian fish-canning projects on Lake Turkana (both of which eventually failed).

During the colonial period, Lodwar functioned as a transit point for British officials moving Kenyan political prisoners to the north. Jomo Kenyatta, Kenya's first president, was restricted to house arrest for two years in Lodwar, beginning in 1959. The town had developed a reputation as an isolated outpost removed from the rest of Kenya, but in recent years Lodwar has expanded and gained commercial and economic prominence.

Overview

Lodwar is considered the capital of the region, housing local and governmental facilities, including Turkana's biggest health facility and the main referral hospital, Lodwar County Hospital (LDH). It is also the seat of the Roman Catholic Diocese of Lodwar. The town is also served by Lodwar Airport.

Climate 
Lodwar has a hot desert climate (Köppen climate classification BWh) with very high temperatures and very little rainfall throughout the year. Lodwar has a very sunny climate year-round, with close to 3,600 hours of sunshine per year.

Issues

Lodwar currently has an electricity crisis. Only about 35 percent of all citizens in Lodwar have access to electricity in their homes. Though it is at the epicentre of the world's largest underground aquifers (this is probably not true), its residents experience intermittent water shortages leading to the deaths of their cattle. The people here are predominantly nomadic pastoralists.

References 

 Elizabeth Watkins,  Jomo's Jailor – Grand Warrior of Kenya. (1993) Mulberry Books 

Populated places in Turkana County
County capitals in Kenya